Pastewnik may refer to the following places in Poland:
Pastewnik, Lower Silesian Voivodeship (south-west Poland)
Pastewnik, Otwock County in Masovian Voivodeship (east-central Poland)